Terrence Jon Campbell (born September 3, 1970) is a Kansas attorney in private practice and is a former nominee to be a United States district judge of the United States District Court for the District of Kansas.

Biography

Campbell was born September 3, 1970 in Fargo, North Dakota. He received a Bachelor of Arts degree in 1992, magna cum laude from the Concordia College. He received a Juris Doctor in 1997, Order of the Coif from the University of Kansas School of Law. Campbell began his legal career as a law clerk to John W. Lungstrum of the United States District Court for the District of Kansas from 1997 to 1999.  In 1999, he joined the law firm of Barber Emerson, L.C. in Lawrence, Kansas, where he practices both civil and criminal litigation, he was elevated to membership in 2005. In 2001, Campbell served part-time as an adjunct professor at the University of Kansas School of Law teaching contracts. From 2005 to 2008, Campbell also served part-time as a Traffic Judge Pro Tem for the District Court of Douglas County, Kansas.

Expired nomination to district court

On January 28, 2016 President Obama nominated Campbell to serve as a United States District Judge of the United States District Court for the District of Kansas, to the seat vacated by Judge Kathryn H. Vratil, who took senior status on April 22, 2014. On Wednesday, December 7, 2016, Campbell, in letters to President Obama and Kansas Senators Pat Roberts and Jerry Moran, requested that his name be withdrawn from further consideration. His nomination expired on January 3, 2017, at the end of the 114th Congress.

References

1970 births
Living people
Concordia College (Moorhead, Minnesota) alumni
Kansas lawyers
Kansas state court judges
Lawyers from Fargo, North Dakota
University of Kansas School of Law alumni
20th-century American lawyers
21st-century American lawyers